Clement Manley Eyler (May 21, 1897 – February 15, 1979) was an American football and basketball coach and educator. He served as the head basketball coach at Milligan College—now known as Milligan University—in Milligan College, Tennessee from 1926 to 1942. Eyler was also the head football coach at Milligan for one season, in 1932.

Eyler studied at the University of Georgia, Columbia University, and the University of Tennessee. In addition to coaching, he was also an English professor at Milligan. Eyler was the superintendent of schools in Bristol, Tennessee for 10 years before joining the English Department at Tennessee Polytechnic Institute—now known as Tennessee Technological University—in Cookeville, Tennessee in 1957.

Eyler died on February 15, 1979, in Cookeville, after a long illness.

Head coaching record

Football

References

1897 births
1979 deaths
School superintendents in Tennessee
Milligan Buffaloes athletic directors
Milligan Buffaloes football coaches
Milligan Buffaloes men's basketball coaches
Milligan University faculty
Tennessee Technological University faculty
Columbia University alumni
University of Georgia alumni
University of Tennessee alumni
Sportspeople from Winston-Salem, North Carolina